André Vauchez (24 April 1939 – 22 September 2021) was a French politician. A member of the Socialist Party, he served in the National Assembly for Jura's 3rd constituency from 1997 to 2002. He also served as mayor of Tavaux from 1977 to 2001.

References

1939 births
2021 deaths
People from Jura (department)
French general councillors
Deputies of the 11th National Assembly of the French Fifth Republic
Socialist Party (France) politicians
Mayors of places in Bourgogne-Franche-Comté